The 2022–23 Utah Tech Trailblazers men's basketball team represented Utah Tech University in the 2022–23 NCAA Division I men's basketball season. The Trailblazers, led by 18th-year head coach Jon Judkins, played home games at Burns Arena in St. George, Utah as members of the Western Athletic Conference (WAC).

The 2022–23 season is Utah Tech's third year of a four-year transition period from Division II to Division I. While the Trailblazers can participate in the WAC tournament, they are not eligible for NCAA postseason play. However, they are eligible to play in the College Basketball Invitational, if invited.

This is Utah Tech's first season under their new name as it was previously known as Dixie State. The Trailblazers nickname is not affected.

Previous season
The Trailblazers finished the 2021–22 season 13–17, 6–12 in WAC play. They were not eligible for the WAC tournament.

Offseason

Coaching changes

Player departures

Incoming transfers

Roster

Schedule and results

|-
!colspan=12 style=| Non-conference regular season

|-
!colspan=12 style=| WAC regular season

|-
!colspan=9 style=| WAC tournament

Source

See also 
2022–23 Utah Tech Trailblazers women's basketball team

References

Utah Tech Trailblazers men's basketball seasons
Utah Tech
Utah Tech Trailblazers men's basketball
Utah Tech Trailblazers men's basketball